Carlo Romei (born 4 September 1999) is an Italian football player.

Club career
He is a product of Sampdoria youth teams and started playing for their Under-19 squad in the 2016–17 season.

On 15 July 2018, he joined Serie C club Vis Pesaro on a season-long loan. He made his Serie C debut for Vis Pesaro on 21 October 2018 in a game against AlfinoLeffe as a 90th-minute substitute for Cristian Hadžiosmanović. The loan was renewed for the 2019–20 season on 16 July 2019. On 31 January 2020, he moved on a new loan to Siena.

On 5 October 2020, he joined Serie C club Potenza on a season-long loan.

References

External links
 

1999 births
Footballers from Rome
Living people
Italian footballers
Association football defenders
U.C. Sampdoria players
Vis Pesaro dal 1898 players
A.C.N. Siena 1904 players
Potenza Calcio players
Serie C players